Calathocosmus mirus is a species of beetle in the family Carabidae, the only species in the genus Calathocosmus.

References

Panagaeinae